A hopper barge is a kind of non-mechanical ship or vessel that cannot move around by itself, unlike some other types of barges, that is designed to carry materials, like rocks, sand, soil and rubbish, for dumping into the ocean, a river or lake for land reclamation.

Hopper barges are seen in two distinctive types; raked hopper or box hopper barges. The raked hopper barges move faster than the box hoppers; they are both designed for movement of dry bulky commodities.

There are several "hoppers" or compartments between the fore and aft bulkhead of the barge. On the bottom of the barge hull, there is (are) also a large "hopper door(s)", opening downwards. The doors are closed while the vessel is moving, so she can carry the materials that are to be dumped. The door(s) open when the ship has arrived at the spot where the materials are to be dumped.

Split barges serve the same purpose, but instead of a door in the hull's bottom, the hull of the whole barge splits longitudinally between the end bulkheads. The vessel consists of two major parts (port and starboard halves), both are mostly symmetrical in design. Both parts of the vessel are hinged at the deck and operated by hydraulic cylinders. When the vessel splits the load is dumped rapidly, which means the barge has to be very stable in order not to capsize or otherwise get damaged.

References

Barges
Ship types